Acorns Children's Hospice Trust is a registered charity, offering a network of palliative care and support to life-limited and life-threatened children and their families across the West Midlands region and part of South West England. Acorns has three hospices, situated in Birmingham, Walsall and Worcester as well as a community team that offer support to families in their homes. The catchment area for the Hospices comprises the counties of Warwickshire, Worcestershire, Herefordshire, Gloucestershire as well as parts of Staffordshire, Shropshire, and the West Midlands.

Acorns provide a network of specialist palliative nursing care and support for babies, children and young people aged 0–18 who have life-limiting or life-threatening conditions and associated complex needs. In the year 2018–19, the hospice supported 787 children and 1,223 families, including those who are bereaved.

Acorns relies on the community to fund the majority of its activities.

Hospices
Acorns operates three hospices
 Birmingham; location: Selly Oak; opened 1988
 Black Country; location: Walsall; opened 1999
 Three Counties; location: Worcester; opened 2005

Shops 
The trust runs over 50 shops across the "Heart of England." Acorns has the largest regional charity retail chain and in 2015-2016 they raised over £1.5million. Acorns now have two furniture shops in Chelmsley Wood and at Beckett's in Wythall.

Acorns also have a boutique retail outlet in Station Road, Solihull and in Barnt Green, that deals in high-quality ladies' wear and fashionable accessories.

Aston Villa 
Aston Villa F.C. have supported Acorns since 2006 and has already paid for 230 days' worth of hospice care. Several players have visited the children and families who use Acorns. Acorns highlighted the need for further assistance to aid the extra thousand children in the local area who needed the assistance of Acorns. Aston Villa responded by offering a platform to advertise the Hospice to a wider audience. On 7 July 2008, the club unveiled the kit for the 2008–09 season which has the Acorns logo in the position associated with the main kit sponsor. An Acorns spokesperson said "We are absolutely delighted that our logo will be seen at every home and away match during the 2008–09 season, helping to raise awareness of our work and of the constant need by all children's hospices to fundraise. This really is the beginning of an amazing partnership, believed to be the first of its kind in the Premier League." The deal was extended for the 2009–10 season. For the 2010–11 season onwards, Acorns is Aston Villa's Official Charity Partner. When Marc Albrighton scored the 20,000th goal in Premier League history, he chose Acorn's as the charity to receive the £20,000 prize donation.

References

External links 

Organizations established in 1983
Charities based in Birmingham, West Midlands
Buildings and structures in Worcester, England
Hospices in England
1983 establishments in England
Health in Birmingham, West Midlands
Health in Worcestershire